Soul Street was a commercial-free, classic soul satellite radio station.  It is channel 60 on XM Satellite Radio and on Channel 841 on DirecTV.  The channel played soul music from the late 1950s until the early 1970s.

Bobby Bennett was Program Director for the channel from its 2001 inception through 2008.  In October 2008, Bennett and fellow on-air personality Leigh Hamilton were dismissed by XM following its merger with former rival Sirius. On November 12, 2008 Sirius XM replaced Soul Street with Soul Town.

Defunct radio stations in the United States
Radio stations established in 2001
Radio stations disestablished in 2008